Yellow rat snake may refer to:
 Spilotes pullatus, a large nonvenomous colubrid snake endemic to Mesoamerica
 Pantherophis obsoletus (quadrivittata), a color variation of a large nonvenomous colubrid snake endemic to the southeastern United States